Jesús G (born in Loreto, Zacatecas, Mexico 1968) and is the second person in his family born with a rare condition known as hypertrichosis. His face is covered with hair, making him resemble the legendary wolfman or, as some call him, a monkey man. He is married and has two daughters, both of whom have the condition. His sister, Lili, was also born with hypertrichosis. She is married with one son, and works as a police officer in Mexico. Many in his family believe that they are descendants of Julia Pastrana, the "Monkey Girl".

In 2007, he was featured in the books Ripley's Believe It or Not!, and Guinness World Records.

Television appearances
It's Not Easy Being a Wolf Boy (BBC)
Human Mutants (BBC)
Grand Prix of Human Wonders (Japan)
The Maury Povich Show
Monsterquest
Chuy, The Wolf Man a feature-length documentary film by Eva Aridjis (Mexico)

Performances
Hellzapoppin Circus SideShow Revue
Ripley's Believe It or Not! (Taiwan)
Sterling & Reid Brothers Circus
Circo Caballero
Brothers Grim Sideshow
Sideshow By The Seashore
Arthurs Family Circus
Venice Beach Freakshow
The Circus of Horrors

References

External links 
"Hidden Lives" Documentary
The Wolf People Family
Chuy the Wolf Boy
Chuy's Photos

Living people
People from Zacatecas
People with hypertrichosis
Sideshow performers
1968 births